Frank Martínez may refer to:
 Frank Martínez (politician)
 Frank Martínez (artist)